Aleksandar "Aleks" Vrteski (born 28 September 1988 in Karratha, Western Australia) is a football goalkeeper who plays for Stirling Lions. Born in Australia, Vrteski represented Australia internationally before switching to represent Macedonia.

Club career
Having been involved with Perth Glory's former youth development scheme, Future Glory, in the past, Vrteski was invited by technical manager, Mich d'Avray, to train with the first team as part of the Pathway to Glory initiative midway through 2005. Vrteski was signed from the Australian Institute of Sport and was the youngest player in the A-League for the 2006-07 season.

In October 2006, Aleks became the club's first choice goalkeeper for the 06/07 season for the first few rounds but was replaced by Jason Petkovic. Petkovic suffered a season (and possibly career) ending injury in Round Nine and Vrteski was a starter for a few more games until the club signed Tommi Tomich who replaced Vrteski in the starting line-up. Vrteski made a move overseas to play for Macedonian club FK Pobeda in 2007 and returned to Australia to sign for Perth Glory for the second time in his career in 2009 where he played as a backup to Tando Velaphi.

Aleks Vrteski has signed with Solo FC in Liga Primer Indonesia. On 22 November 2012 it was announced that the player had been loaned to Newcastle Jets as an injury replacement.

A-League career statistics 
(Correct as of 8 March 2010)

International career
Vrteski has played for Australia at U-17 and U-20 levels. The 17-year-old made his debut for the Young Socceroos, keeping a clean sheet in a 4-0 win over Sri Lanka in Colombo to seal the U-20s' place in the Asian Youth Championships.

As a member of Macedonia U-21 team he played for the friendly match against Croatia U-21 on 11 February 2009.

References

External links
 Perth Glory profile
 Macedonian Football 

1988 births
Living people
People from Karratha, Western Australia
Macedonian footballers
North Macedonia youth international footballers
Australian soccer players
Australia youth international soccer players
Australian people of Macedonian descent
Australian expatriate soccer players
FK Pobeda players
Expatriate footballers in Indonesia
A-League Men players
Perth Glory FC players
Australian Institute of Sport soccer players
Association football goalkeepers